Sparganothoides umbosana is a species of moth of the family Tortricidae. It is found in Sinaloa, Mexico.

The length of the forewings is 11.2 mm for males and 12.5 mm for females. The ground colour of the forewings is mostly golden yellow, with speckling of greyish brown and dark brown scales. The hindwings are greyish white.

The larvae possibly feed on Quercus lobata.

Etymology
The species name refers to the protuberances of the head and is derived from Latin umbo (meaning the boss of a shield).

References

Moths described in 2009
Sparganothoides